Krzysztof Kurczyna (born 15 April 1961) is a Polish judoka. He competed in the men's middleweight event at the 1980 Summer Olympics.

References

1961 births
Living people
Polish male judoka
Olympic judoka of Poland
Judoka at the 1980 Summer Olympics
Sportspeople from Bielsko-Biała